2nd Canadian Infantry Battalion can refer to:

Units of the Canadian Army Pacific Force in 1945:
 2nd Canadian Infantry Battalion (The Hastings and Prince Edward Regiment), 1st Canadian Infantry Regiment
 2nd Canadian Infantry Battalion (The Seaforth Highlanders of Canada), 2nd Canadian Infantry Regiment
 2nd Canadian Infantry Battalion (The Carleton and York Regiment), 3rd Canadian Infantry Regiment

Unit of the Korean War:
 2nd Canadian Infantry Battalion, created in 1952 and in 1953 became 4th Battalion, The Canadian Guards